Clan Gregor, also known as Clan MacGregor, is a Highland Scottish clan that claims an origin in the early 9th century. The clan's most famous member is Rob Roy MacGregor of the late 17th and early 18th centuries. The Clan is also known to have been among the first families of Scotland to begin playing the bagpipes in the early 17th century.

History

Origins of the clan
The Clan Gregor held lands in Glen Orchy, Glenlochy and Glenstrae. According to Iain Moncreiffe the MacGregors were descended from an ancient Celtic royal family, through the Abbots of Glendochart. This is alluded to in the clan's motto: "Royal is my race". There is also a tradition that Gregor was the brother of Kenneth MacAlpin. Though there is little evidence to support this tradition, it is supported by the Scottish historian, William Skene. It is possible that the eponymous Gregor from whom the family derives may have been Griogair, son of Dungal, who was allegedly co-ruler of Alba.

Most modern historians agree that the first chief of Clan Gregor was Gregor of the golden bridles. His son was Iain Camm One eye, who succeeded as the second chief sometime before 1390.

The barony of Loch Awe which included much of the MacGregor lands was granted to the chief of Clan Campbell by Robert the Bruce. The Campbells had already built Kilchurn Castle which controlled the gateway to the western Highlands and they harried the MacGregors who were forced to retire deeper into their lands until they were restricted to Glenstrae.

16th century and clan conflicts

Iain of Glenstrae died in 1519 with no direct heirs. He was the second of his house to be called the Black. The succession of Eian was supported by the Campbells, and he married a daughter of Sir Colin Campbell of Glenorchy. In 1547 Eian's son, Alistair, fought against the English at the Battle of Pinkie Cleugh but died shortly after.

Colin Campbell refused to recognize the claim of Gregor Roy MacGregor to the estates, and for ten years Gregor waged a war against the Campbells. He was an outlaw who raided cattle and sheltered in the high glens. However, in 1570, he was captured and murdered by the Campbells. The chiefship was claimed by his son, Alistair, but he was unable to stem the Campbell's persecution of his kinsmen, who over time became known as the Children of the Mist, a name associated with the MacGregors due to the extent of their losses.

Additionally, John Drummond, of Clan Drummond was the king's forester and was subsequently killed after hanging a number of MacGregors for poaching. The chief took responsibility for the killing and it was condemned by the Privy Council.

17th century, clan conflicts and civil war

In response to the execution of two MacGregor clansmen in the year 1603, Alasdair MacGregor marched into Colquhoun territory with a force of over four hundred men. The chief of Clan Colquhoun, in response, had been granted a royal commission to suppress the MacGregors. Colquhoun assembled a force of five hundred foot and three hundred horse and advanced to Glen Fruin to repel the Highland raiders. MacGregor split his force in two and while the main MacGregor force and the Colquhouns engaged in combat, the second MacGregor force attacked the Colquhouns from the rear. The Colquhouns were driven into the Moss of Auchingaich where their cavalry was useless and over two hundred Colquhouns were killed. At the end of the eighteenth century, in an act of good will, the chiefs of the two clans met and shook hands on the very site of the former slaughter.

In April 1603 James VI of Scotland issued an edict that proclaimed the name of MacGregor as "altogidder abolisheed". This meant that anyone who bore the name must renounce it or suffer death. In 1604, MacGregor and eleven of his chieftains were hanged at Mercat Cross, Edinburgh. As a result, the Clan Gregor was scattered, with many taking other names such as Murray or Grant. They were hunted like animals and flushed out of the heather by bloodhounds.

An Edinburgh burgess, Robert Birrel, who kept a diary of events at the time, described the episode thus,

An Act of the Scottish Parliament from 1617 stated (translated into modern English):

Clan Lamont of Cowal defied this and provided aid and refuge for fleeing MacGregors in their lands in the wake of the persecution. Despite the savage treatment of the MacGregors, they had nevertheless fought for the king during the Scottish Civil War. Two hundred men of the Clan Gregor fought for the Earl of Glencairn in what was known as Glencairn's rising, against the Commonwealth. In recognition of this, Charles II of England repealed the proscription of the name, but William of Orange reimposed it when Charles's brother James VII was deposed.

18th century and Jacobite risings

Rob Roy MacGregor was born in 1671, a younger son of MacGregor of Glengyle. (However, given the circumstances, he had been forced to assume his mother's surname of Campbell). The adventures of Rob Roy MacGregor have been immortalized and romanticized by Sir Walter Scott in his novel Rob Roy. Rob Roy was undoubtedly a thorn in the flesh of the government until he died in 1734. He supported the Jacobite cause in 1715 and after the Battle of Sheriffmuir he set out plundering at will. In one such raid on Dumbarton, the town was put into panic and Dumbarton Castle was forced to open fire with its cannon. He also led Clan Gregor at the Battle of Glen Shiel in 1719. He is buried in Balquhidder churchyard.

During the 1745 uprising, some of Clan Gregor fought at the Battle of Prestonpans with the Jacobite army under the Duke of Perth. Some of Clan Gregor were among the Jacobite force that was defeated at the Battle of Littleferry in 1746 in Sutherland, and therefore missed the Battle of Culloden that took place the next day and which they would have been too late. After the rising, when the MacGregors were returning home, no-one ventured to interfere with them when they strode across Atholl, with their flying colours they strode passed Finlairg Castle where according to one source the Clan Campbell militia "durst not move more than pussies", and the MacGregors defying in broad daylight the outposts which Lord Campbell of Glenorchy had established in the passes.

Persecution of the MacGregors did not end until 1774, when the laws against them were repealed.

19th century and restored clan
To restore pride in the clan, the chiefs needed to be re-established. Eight hundred and twenty six MacGregors subscribed to a petition declaring General John Murray of Lanrick to be the true chief. Murray was in fact a MacGregor who was descended from Duncan MacGregor of Ardchoille, who had died in 1552. His son was Sir Evan, who played a part in the visit of George IV to Scotland in 1822, where he and his clansmen were given the tremendous honour of guarding the Honours of Scotland, better known as the Scottish Regalia and the oldest set of crown jewels in the British Isles.

Clan chief

The current chief of Clan Gregor is Sir Malcolm Gregor Charles MacGregor of MacGregor, 7th Bt. of Lanrick and Balquhidder, 24th Chief of Clan Gregor. His Gaelic designation is An t-Ailpeanach, a name which bears testimony to the clan's traditional descent from Siol Alpin.

Clan profile

Crest badge: The crest badge suitable for members of Clan Gregor to wear consists of the chief's heraldic crest and slogan. The chief's crest is: a lion's head erased Proper, crowned with an antique crown Or.
Plant badge: The clan badge or plant badge of Clan Gregor is Scots pine.

Signet and seal in Iowa
Descendants of Rob Roy MacGregor settled around McGregor, Iowa, and in 1849, it was reported that the original MacGregor seal and signet was owned by Alex McGregor of Iowa. The Scottish Gaelic clan seal was inscribed, "Triogal Ma Dh'ream/Een dhn bait spair nocht", which was interpreted as "I am of royal descent/Slay and spare not". The signet was a bloodstone from Loch Lomond, and was sketched by William Williams. (The "E'en do but spair nocht" bit is Scots.)

Tartans

Many tartans are associated with the name MacGregor. However, only the following are recognized as "clan tartans" by the current chief of Clan Gregor:

Septs

The following table lists clan names and sept names recognized by the Clan Gregor Society. The society states that people who bear the following surnames, or who descend from a woman with one of the following surnames, is eligible for membership. The prefixes M''', Mc and Mac are considered interchangeable, and other spelling variations are also omitted from this list.

Alpin
Fletcher
Greer
Gregg
Graig
Gregor
Gregorson
Gregory
Gregson
Greig
Grewer
Grier
Grierson
Grigg(s)
Grigor
Gruer
Hubberd
King
Lawrence
MacAdam
Macaldowie || Macara ||Macaree || MacChoiter
McGehee
MacConachie
MacCrowther
MacEan
MacEwin
MacGregor
MacGrigor
MacGrowther
MacGruder
Macilduy
MacLeister
MacLiver
MacNee
MacNeice
MacNeish
MacNie
MacPeter(s)
MacPetrie
Magruder
Malloch
Neish
Patullo/Pittillow
Peter
Petrie
Gragg

The following names are documented aliases of MacGregor from the proscription.  Membership is available for individuals who can show evidence of descent or a family tradition of MacGregor connection.

Bain
Beachley
Black
Bowers
Bowie
Coleman
Comrie
Dochart
Dunn
Lakie
Landless
Lawrence
Leckie
Lockie
Mor
Roy
Skinner
White
Whyte
Willox

The following names are traditional aliases of MacGregor with little documented evidence.  Membership is available for individuals who can show evidence of descent or a family tradition of MacGregor connection.

Argyl
Arrowsmith
Begland
Brewer
Caird
Callander
Clark
Craigdallie
Crerar
Crowther
Denison
Docherty
Dorward
Dowie
Fisher
Gair
Goodsir
Grayson
Gudger
Guinness
Kirkwood
Leishman
MacAndrew
MacAngus
MacCanish
MacGeach
Macgehee
Macghee
MacGill
MacGrew
Macnocaird
Macnucator
Nelson
Neilson
Nucator
Orr
Paterson
Peat
Peet
Peterson
Shankland
Stringer
Tainsh
Telfer
Telford
Tossach
Walker
Weliver	

The following names are other clan names that are known to have been used by the MacGregors.  People with the names from this list are properly the domain of other Clan and Family societies, however the MacGregor clan welcomes inquiries from persons bearing these names who can show their descent from a MacGregor who adopted the name as an alias.

Balfour
Buchannan
Campbell
Cunningham
Donald
Dougal
Douglas
Drummond
Erskine
Ferguson
Gordon
Graham
Grant
Hay
Johnson
Johnston
Livingston
MacAlastair
MacDonald
MacDougal
MacEwan
MacFarlane
MacIan
MacInnes
MacLaren
MacNeil
MacNicol
MacPherson
Menzies 
Murray
Ramsay
Stewart
Stirling
Williams
Wilson

See also

 Siol Alpin, clans traditionally thought to descend from the brood of Alpin and thus Cináed, the first accepted King of the Scots.
 Greig (Russian nobility), Russian noble family of Scottish origin.
 Edvard Grieg, Norwegian composer descended from the clan
 Greigia, a genus of the botanical family Bromeliaceae named after Samuel Greig in 1864 by Eduard August von Regel (a director of the St Petersburg Botanical Garden) Tulipa greigii'', a species of tulip named by Regel after Samuel Greig due to Greig once being president of the Russian Horticultural Society
 Niau, an atoll in French Polynesia, named Greig after Aleksey Greig by Russian admiral Fabian Gottlieb von Bellingshausen in 1820

Notes

References

External links
 Clan Gregor Society
 American Clan Gregor Society

Scottish clans
Scottish outlaws